North Hill Marsh Pond is a  pond in Duxbury, Massachusetts, USA.  The pond is the headwaters to the Back River. The pond is located northeast of Round Pond and north of Island Creek Pond.  A wildlife sanctuary borders this pond to the south, and the North Hill Country Club, accessible via Merry Avenue, off Route 14, borders this pond to the northeast. The water quality is impaired due to non-native aquatic plants in the pond.

These series of ponds are all part of the Island Creek Fish Ladder restoration project of 2006.

The Massachusetts Audubon Society's  sanctuary on Mayflower Street includes a forest, bike trails, and a  pond.

References

External links
Environmental Protection Agency
South Shore Coastal Watersheds - Lake Assessments

Ponds of Plymouth County, Massachusetts
Duxbury, Massachusetts
Ponds of Massachusetts